The Hundred Bucks (Hindi:द हंड्रेड बक्स) is a 2020 Indian film directed by Dushyant Pratap Singh. The film stars Kavita Tripathi and Dinesh Bawra in lead. The film is distributed by Manoj Nandwana. The film is written by Vishnupriya Singh.

The screenplay of the above movie is written by M. Salim, an Indian writer known for penning down the screenplay of Dongri Ka Raja. Directed by Hadi Ali Abrar, the movie stars Ronit Roy, Gashmeer Mahajani, and Reecha Sinha in lead roles.

Plot
The hundred Bucks tells the story of one night of a call girl. How she find her customers and how she got cheated.

Cast
 Alya bhati
 Danish taimoor
 Javed Shaikh
 Amar Mehta

References

External links

 
 https://boxofficeindia.com/movie.php?movieid=5813
 https://hindi.filmibeat.com/movies/the-hundred-bucks/story.html

2020 films
2010s Hindi-language films
Indian erotic thriller films
Films about the illegal drug trade
Films set in Mumbai